Axioche  (Άξιόχη) was a nymph in Greek mythology. She was the mother of Chrysippus by Pelops. Elsewhere she is referred to as "Danais".

Notes

References 

 Lucius Mestrius Plutarchus, Moralia with an English Translation by Frank Cole Babbitt. Cambridge, MA. Harvard University Press. London. William Heinemann Ltd. 1936. Online version at the Perseus Digital Library. Greek text available from the same website.

Nymphs